LATAM Perú serves the following destinations as of October 2022:

References

LAN Airlines
Lists of airline destinations